The Virginia Slims of Florida is a defunct WTA Tour affiliated tennis tournament played from 1984 to 1995 in various locations in Florida in the United States. It was held at the Frenchman's Creek Beach & Country Club in Palm Beach Gardens in 1984, at Crandon Park in Key Biscayne from 1985 to 1986, at the Polo Club in Boca Raton from 1987 to 1992, and at the Delray Beach Tennis Center in Delray Beach from 1993 to 1995. The tournament was played on outdoor clay courts in 1984 and on outdoor hard courts from 1985 to 1995.

Steffi Graf was the most successful player at the tournament, winning the singles competition six times. Past singles champions also include Chris Evert and Gabriela Sabatini, who both won the tournament three times.

Past finals

Singles

Doubles

References

External links
 WTA Results Archive

 
Clay court tennis tournaments
Hard court tennis tournaments
1984 establishments in Florida
Recurring sporting events established in 1984
Recurring events disestablished in 1995
Virginia Slims of Florida
1995 disestablishments in Florida